is a Japanese professional baseball pitcher for the Saitama Seibu Lions of Nippon Professional Baseball (NPB).

Career
Taira was drafted by the Saitama Seibu Lions with the team’s fourth selection in the 2017 Nippon Professional Baseball draft out of Yaeyama Commercial High School. Taira spent the 2018 season with Seibu’s farm team, posting a 5.40 ERA in 10 appearances.

On July 19, 2019, Taira made his Nippon Professional Baseball debut. He finished this season with a 2-1 record and 3.38 ERA in 26 appearances. The following season, Taira played in 54 games for Seibu, posting a stellar 1.87 ERA in 53.0 innings of work. Because of his efforts, Taira was named the 2020 Pacific League Rookie of the Year.

On June 28, 2021, Taira tied the NPB record for consecutive mound appearances without giving up a run, with 38, a record also held by former Hanshin Tigers pitcher Kyuji Fujikawa. On July 1, Taira passed Fujikawa and set a new NPB record by making his 39th consecutive mound appearance without giving up a run. Taira’s streak ended at 39 on July 6, when he allowed an RBI hit to Hokkaido Nippon-Ham Fighters hitter Yuto Takahama. In 2021, Taira was named an NPB All-Star for the first time in his career.

References

External links

 Career statistics - NPB.jp

1999 births
Living people
Baseball people from Okinawa Prefecture
Nippon Professional Baseball pitchers
Saitama Seibu Lions players
Nippon Professional Baseball Rookie of the Year Award winners
Baseball players at the 2020 Summer Olympics
Olympic baseball players of Japan
Olympic medalists in baseball
Olympic gold medalists for Japan
Medalists at the 2020 Summer Olympics